St Thomas' Anglican Church, North Sydney is a large Anglican church in Sydney's North Shore. It is located at the corner of Church and McLaren streets, close to the North Sydney central business district. The church is listed on the local government heritage register and is listed on the (now defunct) Register of the National Estate.

History 
The first church called St Thomas' on the site, then named St Leonard's, was designed by Conrad Martens and opened in 1846. Martens personally carved the font, which is still in use. In the later years of the first Rector's time at St Thomas', the Anglican architect Edmund Blacket was recommended to design a larger church; it opened in 1884 in the Victorian Academic Gothic style.

The graveyard holds the remains of many famous colonialists, including Edward Wollstonecraft.

In 1938 a plaque commemorating the founders was unveiled at the church by New South Wales Governor, Lord Wakehurst. Early members of the church included Alexander Berry, William Miller, Thomas Walker, Oswald Bloxsome, James Milson, Conrad Martens, Colonel George Barney, George Lavender, John Blue, and William Shairp.

Rectors include George Charles Bode ??–1880; Stephen Henry Childe 1880–1913; Horace Crotty 1913–1919; Harold Napier Baker 1919–1945; William John Siddens 1945–1970

Service times 
There are three Sunday services at St Thomas'. There is a service at 8:00am (traditional), 10:00am (family service) and 5:00pm (informal).

Church by the Bridge 
Church by the Bridge is a church plant of St Thomas', North Sydney. It is located in Broughton Street, Kirribilli, and offers a contemporary, Bible-based service which meets at 8am, 9.30am, 5:00pm and 6:45pm each Sunday and 5:30pm each Saturday evening, followed by supper.

See also 

 Australian non-residential architectural styles
 List of Anglican churches in the Diocese of Sydney

References

External links 

 St Thomas' Anglican Church website
 Church by the Bridge website

Anglican church buildings in Sydney
Religious organizations established in 1846
Thomas's
1846 establishments in Australia
Gothic Revival church buildings in Australia
Anglican Diocese of Sydney
Edmund Blacket buildings in Sydney
Edmund Blacket church buildings
North Sydney, New South Wales
New South Wales places listed on the defunct Register of the National Estate